One Million Degrees (OMD) is an American non-profit organization based in Chicago, Illinois. OMD aims to assist Chicago-area students from low-income backgrounds to graduate from community college. OMD also assists students in networking with professionals and mentoring in their career field of interest. One Million Degrees provides financial, educational, and emotional support during the participants' studies.

History 
David Scherer, Rose Lizarraga, and the family of Daniel Kerrane founded the Daniel M. Kerrane Foundation in 2002 to assist Chicago-area community college students, and to raise graduation rates in the area. By 2006, the program would evolve into One Million Degrees. The organization aims to provide financial support, mentoring ,and access to training for school and work. In 2006, One Million Degrees began with 21 students. By 2014, 500 students had graduated from the program.

In 2013, Paige Ponder became the CEO of One Million Degrees. Ponder formerly worked in Chicago Public Schools and was the leader of the STEM organization Project Exploration. She also worked in The Grow Network and at McGraw-Hill Education.

In 2014, assistant professor at University of Illinois Lorenzo Baber conducted a study where he interviewed alumni of the One Million Degrees program. His goal was to examine whether or not the program had impacted individual's life trajectories. He found that participants felt the organization focused on each of the individuals, their skills, and their goals, and attempted to expand on those. Baber concluded that One Million Degrees' organizational structure is beneficial because it "fosters a commitment to change and development in their participants". In 2015, a study done by a PhD student at Northwestern University examined how OMD could help people transition into adulthood. The study concluded that OMD's focus on capital and personal growth helped achieve this goal with many other graduates.

In 2017, One Million Degrees was nominated in Inside Philanthropy's fifth annual Philanthropy Awards, recognizing the work of non-for-profits.

Services
Some offerings of One Million Degrees include tutoring, one-on-one program coordinator support, coaching, and stipends for things like transportation, childcare and internet access. As of 2017, there were 800 OMD "scholars" from ten community colleges. "Program assistants" at OMD work to help the students finish their degrees. OMD claims that participants are graduating at a rate of 70% and 94% of graduates are working, continuing their education, or both.

One Million Degrees has had multiple fundraising events. Their eighth annual Food and Wine Benefit, in May 2015, had over 450 attendees and over $500,000 dollars was raised to continue providing resources for low income community college students. Their ninth annual benefit event had an attendance of over 490, and raised over $650,000 plus a grant of $1.5 million from the Caerus Foundation.

United Workers of One Million Degrees  
Glassdoor reviews from 2015-present speak to a number of employees' concerns about the organization's work culture: "Direct service workers are not included in decision making regarding clients. Leadership perceives constructive criticism and feedback as an attack, leading to a culture of shame and lack of transparency."

Citing concerns over workload, a lack of voice in their workplace, and improving the program for their students, employees at One Million Degrees voted unanimously to form a union - the United Workers of One Million Degrees - in September 2018 with Cook County College Teachers Union (AFT-IFT).

Contract negotiations are ongoing.

Partnerships 
Working with Chicago Mayor Rahm Emanuel's program "Beyond the Diploma", One Million Degrees provides students with vocational training and certification programs. In conjunction with city businesses, the staff mentor and support adults who are getting an education while working. In recognition of One Million Degrees' work with local community college students, Emanuel accompanied OMD and other recipients of the Chicago Innovation Awards in New York City to ring the closing bell at the NASDAQ stock exchange.

References 

Educational charities based in the United States
Non-profit organizations based in Chicago
Education in Chicago
Organizations established in 2006
2006 establishments in Illinois